Contact is the ninth studio album by German DJ André "ATB" Tanneberger, It was released on 24 January 2014 through Kontor Records.

Release
Like the previous album, Distant Earth, Contact was released in three varieties: standard 2 CD version, 3-CD Box Set and a Deluxe Fan Box (which was limited to 2000 copies and sold via Amazon).

The album standard edition contains 2 CDs. The first CD contains standard ATB tracks, and features collaborations with artists like Jes, York, JanSoon, Stanfour, Tiff Lacey and Sean Ryan. The second CD is an ambient-chillout disc, and contains tracks in collaboration with Anova, Stefan Erbe or Fade. In Japan, however, the release presents only the first CD.

The third disc, available in the Box Set, contains remixes of tracks found on the first CD, two tracks from ATB in Concert Live in New York, and an exclusive behind-the-scenes video from ATB's American tour. The limited edition Fan Box contains all three discs, 5 ATB postcards (one of which is handsigned by the DJ himself), an ATB sticker and an ATB flag.

Track listing

Charts

Certifications

References

External links

 ATB's official website
 ATB's official Facebook page

2014 albums
ATB albums